, is a suburban district of Shanghai.

History
The area was the scene of heavy fighting during the Battle of Shanghai.

Landmarks
The War of Resistance Memorial Park on Donglin Lu has a small museum with artifacts from the Second World War and a modern glass-and-steel pagoda.

The Wisdom Bay Industrial Park has the world's largest concrete 3D printed pedestrian bridge.

Education
The main campus of Shanghai University is located in Baoshan District. One of several schools in the district, Xing Zhi Middle School was founded by the famous educationalist from Nanjing, Tao Xingzhi. Shanghai Xingzhi High School and the High School Affiliated to Shanghai University are also located in the district.

Transport
Baoshan District is served by the Shanghai Metro. There are 4 lines from Baoshan to central Shanghai—Line 1, Line 3, Line 7, and Line 15 —which operate as subways and elevated rail in different parts of the district. The 952B rapid bus runs from the district to People's Square in central Shanghai, being one of the many buses that link the district to central Shanghai.

Ferries to Chongming Island operate from Wusong, Baoyang Rd, and Shidongkou. Ferries to Putuoshan from Wusong are also available.

Economy
The district is home to Baosteel Group's original factory, still a major producer of iron and steel. Rovio Entertainment has its China offices in Baoshan District. The Shidongkou Power Station is located along the Yangtze.

Government

Subdivisions

Transportation

Metro
Baoshan is currently served by four metro lines operated by Shanghai Metro:
 - Tonghe Xincun, Hulan Road, Gongfu Xincun, Bao'an Highway, West Youyi Road, Fujin Road
 - West Yingao Road, South Changjiang Road , Songfa Road, Zhanghuabang, Songbin Road, Shuichan Road, Baoyang Road, Youyi Road, Tieli Road, North Jiangyang Road
 - Meilan Lake, Luonan Xincun, Panguang Road, Liuhang, Gucun Park, Qihua Road, Shanghai University, Nanchen Road, Shangda Road, Changzhong Road, Dachang Town, Xingzhi Road, Dahuasan Road
 - South Changjiang Road , Yingao Road

See also

 Wusong

References

Further reading

 

 
Districts of Shanghai